Crofting is a form of land tenure and small-scale food production particular to the Scottish Highlands, the islands of Scotland, and formerly on the Isle of Man.
Within the 19th-century townships, individual crofts were established on the better land, and a large area of poorer-quality hill ground was shared by all the crofters of the township for grazing of their livestock.

Practice 
Crofting is a traditional social system in Scotland defined by small-scale food production. Crofting is characterised by its common working communities, or "townships". Each township manages poorer-quality hill ground as common grazing for cattle and sheep.

Land use in the crofting counties is constrained by climate, soils, and topography. Since the late 20th century, the government has classified virtually all of the agricultural land in the Highlands and Islands as Severely Disadvantaged, under the terms of the Less Favoured Area (LFA) Directive, yet these areas still receive the lowest LFA payments.  Most crofters cannot survive economically by crofting agriculture alone, and they pursue a number of other activities to earn their livelihood.

Despite its challenges, crofting is important to the Highlands and Islands. In 2014–2015 there were 19,422 crofts, with 15,388 crofters. Some crofters have the tenancy of more than one croft, and in-croft absenteeism means that tenancies are held but crofts are not farmed.
About 33,000 family members lived in crofting households, or around 10% of the population of the Highlands and Islands. Crofting households represented around 30% of those in the rural areas of the Highlands, and up to 65% of households in Shetland, the Western Isles, and Skye.
There were 770,000 hectares under crofting tenure, roughly 25% of the agricultural land area in the Crofting Counties. Crofters held around 20% of all beef cattle (120,000 head) and 45% of breeding ewes (1.5 million sheep). Crofting is regulated by the Crofting Commission.

Requirements 

Tenants and owner-occupier crofters are required to comply with a range of duties specified in sections 5AA to 5C and 19C of the Crofters (Scotland) Act 1993 as amended. There is a duty to be ordinarily resident within 32 km of the croft. If the croft is the sole dwelling and the crofter's family are residents while the croft is away this would probably be accepted as ordinarily resident. Other circumstances involving other places of residence would require to be assessed individually. In addition to the duty of residential tenants and owner-occupiers crofters are required to ensure the croft is cultivated, maintained and not neglected or misused.

History 
Crofting communities were a product of the Highland Clearances (though individual crofts had existed before the clearances). They replaced the farms or bailtean, which had common grazing and arable open fields operated on the run rig system. This change was typically associated with two things. Firstly the tacksmen were steadily eliminated over the last quarter of the 18th century. A tacksman (a member of the daoine uaisle, sometimes described as "gentry" in English) was the holder of a lease or "tack" from the landowner. Where a lease was for a baile, the tacksman usually sublet to the farming tenants and may have provided some management oversight. By preventing this section of society from sub-letting, the landlords obtained all of the rent paid by those who worked the land. Secondly, landowners replaced the older farming methods with pastoral systems. In early cases, these were based on cattle. Much more common was the introduction of extensive sheep farms. In many clearances, the tenants of inland farms were moved to crofting communities in coastal areas, leaving the land they had left for sheep. This type of clearance was carried out mostly until the 1820s.

The crofts created by clearance were not intended to support all the needs of those who lived there and consequently were restricted in size to a few acres of arable land with surrounding shared grazing. Landlords intended their crofting tenants to work in various industries, such as fishing or kelp. A contemporary estimate was that a crofter needed to carry out 200 days of work away from his croft in order to avoid destitution. In the second half of the 19th century, many crofters provided a substantial migrant workforce, especially for lowland farms.

Crofting communities were badly hit by the Highland Potato Famine. The small arable plots had meant that the potato was an essential crop, due to its high productivity. The arrival of potato blight (and the collapse of the kelp industry a few years before) made some crofting communities inviable. This gave rise to the second phase of the Highland Clearances, when many tenants left the Highlands, often emigrating.

In the 21st century, crofting is found predominantly in the rural Western and Northern Isles and in the coastal fringes of the western and northern Scottish mainland.

The Crofters' Holdings (Scotland) Act 1886 provided for security of tenure, a key issue as most crofters remain tenants. The Act encouraged tenants to improve the land under their control, as it ensured that the control could be transferred within families and passed to future generations.

Croft work was hard, back-breaking work which yielded a subsistence living.

Crofters were given the right to purchase their individual crofts in 1976. In 2003, as part of the Land Reform Act, crofting community bodies were provided with the right to purchase eligible croft land associated with the local crofting community.

See also 
 
 Allotment
 Croft

References

External links 
The Scottish Crofting Federation
Articles
 Crofters, Indigenous People of the Highlands and Islands at Scottish Crofting Foundation

 
Land tenure
Gaelic culture